A  (often shortened to ;), French for "living picture", is a static scene containing one or more actors or models. They are stationary and silent, usually in costume, carefully posed, with props and/or scenery, and may be theatrically lit. It thus combines aspects of theatre and the visual arts.

A tableau may either be 'performed' live, or depicted in painting, photography and sculpture, such as in many works of the Romantic, Aesthetic, Symbolist, Pre-Raphaelite, and Art Nouveau movements.

In the late 19th and early 20th centuries, tableaux sometimes featured  ('flexible poses') by virtually nude models, providing a form of erotic entertainment, both on stage and in print.

Tableaux continue to the present day in the form of living statues, street performers who busk by posing in costume.

Origin 
Occasionally, a Mass was punctuated with short dramatic scenes and painting-like . They were a major feature of festivities for royal weddings, coronations and royal entries into cities.  Often the actors imitated statues or paintings, much in the manner of modern street entertainers, but in larger groups, and mounted on elaborate temporary stands along the path of the main procession. Johan Huizinga, in The Autumn of the Middle Ages, describes the use and design of tableaux vivants in the late middle ages.  Many paintings and sculptures probably recreate tableaux vivants, by which art historians sometimes account for groups of rather static figures.  Artists were often the designers of public pageanty of this sort.

The history of Western visual arts in general, until the modern era, has had a focus on symbolic, arranged presentation, and (aside from direct personal portraiture) was heavily dependent on stationary artists' models in costume – essentially small-scale  with the artist as temporary audience. The Realism movement, with more naturalistic depictions, did not begin until the mid-19th century, a direct reaction against Romanticism and its heavy dependence on stylized  format.

On stage

Before radio, film and television,  were popular forms of entertainment, even in American frontier towns. This could be done as an amateur venture in a drawing room, or as a more professionally produced series of  presented on a theatre stage, one following another, usually to tell a story without requiring all the usual trappings and production of a full theatre performance. They thus influenced the form taken by later Victorian and Edwardian era magic lantern shows, and perhaps also sequential narrative comic strips (which first appeared in modern form in the late 1890s).

 were often performed as the basis for school Nativity plays in England during the Victorian period; the custom is still practised at Loughborough High School (believed to be one of England's oldest grammar schools for girls). Several  are performed each year at the school carol service, including the depiction of an engraving  (in which the subjects are painted and dressed completely grey).

Theatrical censorship in Britain and the United States forbade actresses to move when nude or semi-nude on stage, so  had a place in risqué entertainment for many years. In the early 1900s, German dancer Olga Desmond appeared in Schönheitsabende ('Evenings of Beauty') in which she posed nude in "living pictures", imitating classical works of art.

In the nineteenth century,  took such titles as "Nymphs Bathing" and "Diana the Huntress" and were to be found at such places as the Hall of Rome in Great Windmill Street, London. Other venues were the Coal Hole in the Strand and the Cyder Cellar in Maiden Lane. Nude and semi-nude  were also a frequent feature of variety shows in the US: first on Broadway in New York City, then elsewhere in the country. The Ziegfeld Follies featured such  from 1917. The Windmill Theatre in London (1932–1964) featured nude  on stage; it was the first, and for many years the only, venue for them in 20th-century London.

 were often included in fairground sideshows (as seen in the 1961 film A Taste of Honey). Such shows had largely died out by the 1970s.  remain a major attraction at the annual Pageant of the Masters in Laguna Beach, California.

Photographic tableaux
Jean-François Chevrier was the first to use the term  in relation to a form of art photography, which began in the 1970s and 1980s in an essay titled "The Adventures of the Picture Form in the History of Photography" in 1989. The initial translation of this text substitutes the English word picture for the French word . While picture is similar, "... it lacks the connotations of constructedness, of being the product of an intellectual act that the French word carries." (p. 146)
Other texts and Clement Greenberg's theory of medium specificity also cover this topic.

The key characteristics of the contemporary photographic  according to Chevrier are, firstly:

They are designed and produced for the wall. summoning a confrontational experience on the part of the spectator that sharply contrasts with the habitual processes of appropriation and projection whereby photographic images are normally received and "consumed" (p. 116)

By this, Chevrier notes that scale and size is obviously important if the pictures are to "hold the wall". But size has another function; it distances the viewer from the object, requiring one to stand back from the picture to take it all in.  This "confrontational" experience, Fried notes, is actually quite a large break from the conventional reception of photography, which up to that point was often consumed in books or magazines.

Pictorialism, according to Jeff Wall could be seen as an attempt by photographers to imitate painting (perhaps unsuccessfully):

Pictorialist photography was dazzled by the spectacle of Western painting and attempted, to some extent, to imitate it in acts of pure composition. Lacking the means to make the surface of its pictures unpredictable and important, the first phase of Pictorialism, Stieglitz's phase, emulated the fine graphic arts, re-invented the beautiful look, set standards for gorgeousness of composition, and faded. (p. 75)

However photography did have the ability to  unpredictable and spontaneous. This was achieved by making photographs related to the inherent capabilities of the camera itself.  And this, Wall argues, was a direct result of photojournalism, and the mass media and pop culture industries. By divesting itself of the encumbrances and advantages inherited from older art forms, reportage, or the spontaneous fleeting aspect of the photographic image pushes toward a discovery of qualities apparently intrinsic to the medium, qualities that must necessarily distinguish the medium from others and through the self-examination of which it can emerge as a modernist art on a plane with others. (pp. 76–78)

The argument is that, unlike most other art forms, photography can profit from the capture of chance occurrences.  Through this process – the snapshot, the "accidental" image – photography invents its own concept of the picture: a hybrid form of the "Western picture" (pictorialist photography) and the spontaneous snapshot.  This is the stage whereby Wall argues that photography enters a "modernist dialectic". Wall states that unpredictability is key to modern aesthetics. This new concept of the picture, which Wall proposes, with the compositional aspects of the Western picture combined with the unpredictability that the camera affords through its shutter, can be seen in the work of many contemporary photographic artists including Luc Delahaye, Andreas Gursky, Thomas Struth, Irene Caesar, and Philip-Lorca diCorcia.

The tableau as a form still dominates the art photography market. As Fried notes: "Arguably the most decisive development in the rise of the new art photography has been the emergence, starting in the late 1970s and gaining impetus in the 1980s and after, of what the French critic Jean-François Chevrier has called the "tableau form" (p. 143).

However, there appears to be only a handful of young, emerging artists working within the tableau form.  Examples include Florian Maier Aichen, Matthew Porter and Peter Funch. More recently, Canadian artist, Sylvia Grace Borda, has worked since 2013 to continue to stage tableaux for the camera within the Google Street View engine. Her work creates 360° immersive tableau vivant images for the viewer to explore. Through her efforts to pioneer the tableaux vivant for online exploration, she and her collaborator, John M. Lynch, won the Lumen Prize 2016 for Web Arts.

Film 
In Pier Paolo Pasolini's 1963 film La ricotta, a film maker tries to have actors represent two paintings, by Jacopo Pontormo and Rosso Fiorentino, of the Passion of Jesus.

The 1969 film The Color of Pomegranates, directed by Sergei Parajanov, presents a loose biography of the Armenian poet Sayat Nova in a series of tableaux vivants of Armenian costume, embroidery and religious rituals depicting scenes and verses from the poet's life.

The 2013 film, A Field in England,<ref>{{cite web|url=https://www.youtube.com/watch?v=cRRvzjkzu2U |archive-url=https://ghostarchive.org/varchive/youtube/20211213/cRRvzjkzu2U |archive-date=2021-12-13 |url-status=live|title=A Field in England – Official UK Trailer|date=21 May 2013|work=Youtube|access-date=22 April 2018}}</ref> makes use of the effect to add to the general occult look of the film.

There is a 2014 Estonian feature film produced entirely in tableau format titled In the Crosswind.

See also
Historical reenactment
Living history
Living statue
Mannequin Challenge
 Oberammergau Passion Play. This passion play is played every ten years in Oberammergau, Germany. It includes several tableaux'' with scenes from the Old Testament.

References

Further reading

External links 

  (1860 text describing how to produce Tableaux Vivants)
 Kate Matthews Collection (Photograph collection includes 83 examples of tableaux vivants)

Theatrical genres
Medieval drama
Nudity in theatre and dance